Bill Nighy is an English actor of the stage and screen.

Film

Television

Theatre

Radio

Video games

Audio drama

Music Video

References

External links

 
 Bill Nighy: A Life in Pictures Interview at BAFTA
 
 
 Silk Sound Books 

Male actor filmographies